Chvalkovice may refer to places in the Czech Republic:

Chvalkovice (Náchod District), a municipality and village in the Hradec Králové Region
Chvalkovice (Vyškov District), a municipality and village in the South Moravian Region
Chvalkovice, a village and part of Dešná (Jindřichův Hradec District) in the South Bohemian Region
Chvalkovice na Hané, a village and part of Ivanovice na Hané in the South Moravian Region